Gullfoss ("Golden Falls") is a waterfall located in the canyon of the Hvítá river in southwest Iceland.

History and description

During the first half of the 20th century and some years into the late 20th century, there was much speculation about using Gullfoss to generate electricity. During this period, the waterfall was rented indirectly by its owners, Tómas Tómasson and Halldór Halldórsson, to foreign investors. However, the investors' attempts were unsuccessful, partly due to lack of money. The waterfall was later sold to the state of Iceland, and is now protected.

Sigríður Tómasdóttir, the daughter of Tómas Tómasson, was determined to preserve the waterfall's condition and even threatened to throw herself down. Although it is widely believed, the very popular story that Sigríður saved the waterfall from exploitation is untrue. A stone memorial to Sigriður, located above the falls, depicts her profile.

Gullfoss is one of the most popular tourist attractions in Iceland. Together with Þingvellir and the geysers of Haukadalur, Gullfoss forms part of the Golden Circle, a popular day excursion for tourists in Iceland.

In popular culture
Gullfoss appears on the cover of the album Porcupine by the British band Echo and the Bunnymen.  Additionally, the falls are referenced in the novella The Odd Saga of the American and a Curious Icelandic Flock; during a dinner, Snorri expresses a preference for Gullfoss, while Dr. Gustafsson favors Glymur. Gullfoss features in the music video for the single "Heaven" by the band Live. Gullfoss appears briefly in a sub-plot of the TV series Vikings, and one character kills herself by diving into it.

Gullfoss appears in the penultimate episode of the thirty-fourth season of the American reality competition The Amazing Race.

See also
 List of rivers of Iceland
 Waterfalls of Iceland

References

External links

The Official Gullfoss website 
Live webcam located at Gullfoss
Gullfoss gallery from islandsmyndir.is
Gullfoss Gallery
Gullfoss.org Information and photos of Gullfoss
Gullfoss virtual tour 

Articles containing video clips
Canyons and gorges of Iceland
Tourist attractions in Iceland
Waterfalls of Iceland